Ross Township is a township in Cherokee County, Kansas, USA.  As of the 2000 census, its population was 893.

Geography
According to the USGS, it contains one cemetery, Edgmand.

Mineral Lake is within this township.

References
 USGS Geographic Names Information System (GNIS)

External links
 City-Data.com

Townships in Cherokee County, Kansas
Townships in Kansas